Sir Hugh Guion MacDonell  (5 March 1831, Florence, Italy – 25 January 1904, London) was a British diplomat who was envoy to Brazil, Denmark and Portugal.

Background
MacDonell was born in Florence on 5 March 1831, the second son of the marriage of Hugh MacDonell of Aberchalder (Scottish Clan MacDonell of Glengarry) and Ida Louise Ulrich. He succeeded his brother Sir Alexander Frederick MacDonell in the representation of the family in the Glengarry Council in Canada. His eldest sister, married to the Alexandre Jean Aguado y Moreno, II Marqués de las Marismas del Guadalquivir, was Dame du Palais to the Empress Eugenie. Another sister, Ida MacDonell, married Don Augusto Conte y Lerdo de Tejada, Spanish Diplomant and Minister Plenipoteniary at Copenhagen.

Life and career
MacDonell attended Royal Military College, Sandhurst, and was commissioned a second lieutenant in the Rifle Brigade on 22 December 1848, He served in British Kaffraria 1849–52, but retired from the army on account of ill-health in 1853 and joined the diplomatic service. He was attaché at Washington and Constantinople. In 1865 he was appointed to Rio de Janeiro as Second Secretary. He did not, however, go there, but took up a similar position at Copenhagen in the following years. He served successively at Buenos Aires, Madrid and Berlin where, in many occasions, he acted as Chargé d'Affaires. At Buenos Aires he met his distinguished wife, Anne Lumb (daughter of Edward Lumb of Wallington Lodge, Surrey). He was transferred to Rome in 1874, and was promoted to be  Chargé d'Affaires at Munich in 1882. In 1885 he went as Envoy Extraordinary and Minister Plenipotentiary to Brazil. In 1888 he proceeded in a similar rank to the Court of Denmark. His last post was a posting as Envoy Extraordinary and Minister Plenipotentiary to Portugal in 1893, where he stayed until he retired on a pension in 1902.

Honours
MacDonell was appointed a Companion of the Order of the Bath (CB) in 1890, knighted as a Knight Commander of the Order of St Michael and St George (KCMG) in 1892 and raised to Knight Grand Cross of the order (GCMG) in 1899. He was appointed a Privy Counsellor on 11 August 1902, following an announcement of the King's intention to make this appointment in the 1902 Coronation Honours list published in June that year.

Sources

MACDONELL, Rt Hon. Sir Hugh Guion, Who Was Who, A & C Black, 1920–2014 (online edition, Oxford University Press, 2014)
Sir Hugh Guion MacDonell, The Clan Donald, 1904

References

1831 births
1904 deaths
Graduates of the Royal Military College, Sandhurst
Rifle Brigade officers
Ambassadors of the United Kingdom to Brazil
Ambassadors of the United Kingdom to Denmark
Ambassadors of the United Kingdom to Portugal
Knights Grand Cross of the Order of St Michael and St George
Companions of the Order of the Bath
Members of the Privy Council of the United Kingdom